The Olympus Pen F, Pen FT and Pen FV are very similar half-frame 35 mm single-lens reflex (SLR) cameras with interchangeable lenses produced by Olympus of Japan between 1963-1966 (Pen F), 1966-1972 (Pen FT) and 1967-1970 (Pen FV).

The original Pen F has a double-stroke film advance and a distinctive logo rendered in a gothic font. The later Pen FT added a single-stroke film advance, and an uncoupled, integrated light meter, which uses a system of exposure numbers rather than f-stops. The exposure numbers were added to the aperture rings of later Pen F lenses; the rings could be pulled out and rotated to show conventional f-stops instead. A side-effect of the FT's light meter was a dimmer viewfinder. The Pen FV was essentially a Pen FT with the light meter deleted and the F's brighter viewfinder reinstated.

Half frame means that the camera uses an 18×24 mm vertical (portrait) format, producing twice the pictures on a roll of 135 film as the regular 36×24 mm format.  The smaller image format also allows for a smaller camera and lenses, making the Pen F system one of the smallest SLR systems ever made; the Pentax Auto 110 was smaller, but with a much more limited range of lenses and accessories, and smaller 110 film.

These cameras are somewhat exceptional since they used a rotary focal-plane shutter, rather than the two-curtain focal-plane shutter commonly used in other SLRs at that time.  Since this one-piece shutter opens fully before it starts to close, it can synchronize to electronic flash at all shutter speeds.

Pen-F series cameras are occasionally modified to mount standard motion picture camera lenses for use as film test cameras with 35mm motion picture films. The Pen-F frame size is close to the 35mm motion picture Super 35 frame.

Lenses manufactured for the Olympus Pen F System

 *M=manual diaphragm

References

 Nakamura, Karen (2005). Classic cameras: Olympus Pen F.  PhotoEthnography.com.  Retrieved on November 13, 2005.
 Gandy, Stephen (2003). Olympus Pen F, FT, FV: Largest Half-frame System. CameraQuest.com.  Retrieved on November 13, 2005.
 McGloin, Joe (2004).  Olympus Pen F Cameras.  The Sub Club.  Retrieved on November 13, 2005.

Pen F
135 film cameras
Cameras introduced in 1963
Products introduced in 1963